George Julian may refer to:

 George E. Julian (1893–1977), American football fullback for Michigan Agricultural College (1911–1914) and the Canton Bulldogs (1915–1916)
 George Washington Julian (1817–1899), American politician, lawyer and writer who served in Congress from Indiana

See also
 George Julian Harney (1817–1897), British political activist
 George Julian Howell, Australian soldier
 George Julian Zolnay (1863–1949), Hungarian and American sculptor